An Operator Training Simulator (OTS) is a computer-based training system that uses a dynamic simulation model of an industrial process, usually integrated with an emulator of the process plant's Distributed Control System (DCS).

Elements 
An OTS uses a dynamic simulation of the process in order to generate the appropriated data to feed an emulation of the plant's control system. The elements of a typical OTS are the following:
 Dynamic simulation software
 Process model
 Instructor interface
 Control system integration software
 DCS emulator
 Replica of the operator station

Applications 
Common applications of OTS systems are the following:
 New control room operator training (e.g., start-up, shutdown, and emergency procedures)
 Existing control room operator refresher training (e.g., start-up, shutdown, and emergency procedures)
 Platform for advanced process control (APC) and optimization
 Validating DCS control and logic checkout
 Validating and improving plant operating procedures
 “What if?” analysis (scenario analysis)
 Engineering tool for developing and testing new control strategies

See also 
 Dispatcher training simulator, a computer system for training operators of electrical power grids
 E-learning

Virtual learning environments
Simulation software